Raiano is a railway station in Raiano, Italy. The station is located on the Terni–Sulmona railway. The train services are operated by Trenitalia.

History
The station was opened in 1875 and, unfortunately, suffered the bombing of the Second World War, but was rebuilt immediately afterwards. The passenger building is equipped with a waiting room with a validator of tickets. There are 2 tracks, passenger trains cross each other.

Train services
The station is served by the following service(s):

Regional services (Treno regionale) L'Aquila - Sulmona

References

This article is based upon a translation of the Italian language version as at October 2014.

Railway stations in Abruzzo
Buildings and structures in the Province of L'Aquila